Sandy Alomar may refer to:
Sandy Alomar Sr. (born 1943), former infielder and coach in Major League Baseball
Sandy Alomar Jr. (born 1966), former catcher and coach in Major League Baseball